Rongwo Monastery (formally), is a Tibetan Buddhist monastery in Tongren County, Huangnan Tibetan Autonomous Prefecture, Qinghai, China.

Name
The monastery is named after the Rongwo River upon which it is located.

History

Rongwo Monastery was initially established as a three monastery site in 1341 in by Rongwo Samten Rinpoche. Samten’s younger brother was the architect and designer of the monasteries. The first monastery built was the Temple of 3 Buddhas and then the Golden Temple and other temples.  Shartsang Kaldan Gyatso (1607-1677) is recognized as the 1st re-incarnation of Rongwo Samten Rinpoche and was the founder of the current monastery on the temples' sites. The 8th re-incarnation of Shartsang Rinpoche was recognized and installed in October 1991.  Yarba Chogyi built the prayer hall, the Victory Stupa and the stupas at the 4 corners of the monastery, had the sayings of Buddha written in gold, and commissioned the statues of Je Tsongkhapa. Shartsang Kaldan Gyatso established the first monastic college, Tsennyi Tratsang, in which Buddhist dialectics, vinaya, Madhyamika philosophy, Prajnaparamita, and Abhidharma are still currently taught, in 1630. Following multiple subsequent re-incarnations, the 7th incarnation of Shartsang Rinpoche, Lobsang Trinley Longtok Gyatso, increased the number of colleges to the present: the Tsennyi Tratsang, the Gyamat Tratsang (tantric College, where tantric scriptures and practices are taught) and the Duikor Tratsang, a monastic college of the wheel of time that is also known as the College of Kalachakra, the 10 syllable mantra. This information was provided at the monastery in June 2006 and is translated from their official documents.

Footnotes

Tibetan Buddhist temples in Qinghai
Gelug monasteries
Amdo
Major National Historical and Cultural Sites in Qinghai
Buddhist temples in Huangnan Tibetan Autonomous Prefecture
Buddhist monasteries in Qinghai